Rusk County is the name of two counties in the United States:

 Rusk County, Texas
 Rusk County, Wisconsin